Microcrambus minor is a moth in the family Crambidae. It was described by William Trowbridge Merrifield Forbes in 1920. It is found in North America, where it has been recorded from Alabama, Florida, Illinois, Indiana, Manitoba, Maryland, Massachusetts, Minnesota, Mississippi, New Hampshire, New York, North Carolina, Ohio, Oklahoma, Ontario, Pennsylvania, Quebec, South Carolina, Tennessee, West Virginia, Virginia, and Wisconsin.

References

Crambini
Moths described in 1920
Moths of North America